Lily Sosa de Newton (October 24, 1920 — May 14, 2017) was an Argentine historian, biographer and essayist. She was a pioneer in historical research on relevant Argentine women in different fields. She also wrote numerous biographies of historical figures.<ref name="cla">{{cite web|url=http://edant.clarin.com/diario/1998/05/04/e-05702d.htm|title=Una vida dedicada a la investigación]|date=1998-04-05|access-date=2019-03-28|language=es|trans-title=RETIRED: LILY SOSA DE NEWTON, HISTORIAN, BIOGRAPHY AND ASSISTANT}}</ref>

 First Years 
She was born on October 24, 1920 in Morón Province of Buenos Aires, a few kilometres from the capital. It was there where her paternal and maternal grandparents lived and where her parents had married. She had an older brother and a younger sister. Then they moved to the city of Buenos Aires, where she studied, first in the Liceo No. 1 and then as a teacher in the 'colegio de Adoratrices'.

In 1938 she met Jorge Newton, journalist and writer. Later on she married this renowned Argentine historian, who urged her to investigate and write. They wrote together some titles in co-authorship, both books and newspaper articles.

In 1941, newly married, they went to live in Santa Fe because her husband had been appointed editor of a new newspaper, Santa Fe de Hoy. They lived there for three years.

 Career 
Lily Sosa de Newton was a pioneer in visualising women and wrote the Biographical Dictionary of Argentine Women'' in 1970, when no one dealt with these issues.

She wrote her first essay Las Argentinas de ayer y hoy' (the Argentinian women from then and today) which had a very favorable review in all newspapers. She became a member of the SADE and that year she won the 'Faja de Honor' in the Essay category.

The Editorial Plus Ultra, which published books by Jorge Newton-a series about the caudillos of the provinces- proposed her to write about characters in Argentine history such as Lavalle, Dorrego and Paz, among others. In a few years, she published those three biographies, and also that of Gregorio Aráoz de Lamadrid.

Excited with the success of 'Las Argentinas de ayer y hoy, she faced a very arduous work, which was the Biographical Dictionary of Argentine Women. On the basis of the file of names, which she had done for her previous essay, she began to write biographies of all the most outstanding historical female characters, from the world of literature, art, education and politics.

She won the first prize in the contest of EUDEBA (Editorial University of Buenos Aires) for the Collection "Genius and Figure" with her book on Hilario Ascasubi, published in 1980, and the Honorable Mention Award "Ricardo Rojas" in Buenos Aires. She published 'Narradoras argentinas' (1852-1932) in 1995 and in 1999 'Las protagonistas', a collection of short biographies of international characters. In 2007, 'Las Argentinas y su historia' was published. It was an essay published with the support of the BA Culture Fund (Metropolitan Program for the Promotion of Culture, Arts and Sciences), of the Government of the city of Buenos Aires. She participated in congresses and diverse meetings about history and feminine problems and her work has been published in acts and collective works, as well as collaborations in magazines and newspapers.

She worked until 1998 as press and public relations director of Editorial Plus Ultra. She participated in graphic media, television and radio.

She died on May 14, 2017 at Ciudadela.

Books 

  (with Jorge Newton).
  (junto a Jorge Newton).
 
 
 
 
 
  Reedited by Plus Ultra in 1980

References 

20th-century Argentine women
Argentine biographers
Argentine women historians
20th-century Argentine historians
Argentine essayists
1920 births
2017 deaths
Women biographers
21st-century Argentine historians